Christos Ribas (1913 – 19 October 1981) was a Greek footballer who played as a goalkeeper for AEK Athens and a manager. His nickname was "The Bird".

Club career

Ribas started football in 1927, at the age of 14, playing as a striker for Atromitos Nea Ionia. The following year the Hungarian coach Sveg watched him play as a goalkeeper for the Athens College Branch team at the stadium of Panellinios and invited him to enroll in the infrastructure sections of AEK Athens.

In 1929 he was promoted to the first team and in 5 May of that year, he made his debut against Ferencvárosi, for the Easter Cup. On 27 December 1931, he impressed with his performance against Wacker, for the Christmas Cup. On 28 May 1939, Ribas played in the Cup final against PAOK, at Leoforos Alexandras Stadium, where AEK won their second Cup in their history winning by 2–1. He was the main goalkeeper of AEK Athens until the end of his career as a footballer in 1947, winning 2 consecutive Panhellenic Championships, 2 Cups and 3 Athens FCA Championships, including the first domestic double in by a Greek club in 1939.

International career
Ribas played 9 times for Greece including his last one as captain. In 1933, he was invited to the Balkan mixed team for a match against the World mixed team, which was eventually postponed.

After football
After the end of his career as a footballer, Ribas was involved with AEK, becoming a member of their staff, while also managing teams such as Egaleo, Loutraki, Elefsina and Markopoulo.

Personal life
Ribas was married and had a son named Alexander. He died on 19 October 1981.

Honours

AEK Athens
Panhellenic Championship: 1938–39, 1939–40
Greek Cup: 1931–32, 1938–39
Athens FCA League: 1940, 1946, 1947

See also
List of one-club men in association football

References

External links
Official website of Amateur AEK
When Christos Ribas left, Stavros Kazantzoglou''

1913 births
1981 deaths
Greece international footballers
Association football goalkeepers
Footballers from Athens
Greek footballers
AEK Athens F.C. players
People from Manisa